Talhi Mangini is a town of Bhawana City, tehsil of Chiniot District in Punjab, province of Pakistan. It is located at left bank of river Chenab.

Introduction 

The residents of the town are Chadhar (Chudhary Wattoo Chadhar), Syed and Thabal tribes. This is a cultural area of Bhawana located at bank of Chenab River.

See also 
 Bhawana
 Bhawana Tehsil
 Chiniot
 Chiniot District

Chiniot District
Populated places in Chiniot District